The Louisiana Club was a club located at 1322 North F Street on the West Side of Las Vegas, Nevada.

History 
It opened on August 16, 1955, and while some sources say the original owner of the club was named Wong who operated it until April 18, 1966, others say it was originally named Zee Louie's Chickadee Club and was later changed to the Louisiana Club but that it closed in 1957 when Zhei Lhou moved to San Francisco, and still others say it was called the Chickadee, but when Zee Louie bought it, he renamed it the Louisiana Club. In 1957 or 1958 when Sarann Knight-Preddy, who had returned from Hawthorne, Nevada, where she had run the first club licensed to a black woman went to work there it was named the Louisiana and Zee Louie (also known as Zhei Lhou) reportedly acquired it on April 19, 1966, after he returned from San Francisco.

Though its ownership is unclear, sources agree that the owners were Chinese and that there was no issue with racism there which was encountered in white-owned businesses. The club was licensed for blackjack, craps, keno and slot machines. The Louisiana closed on May 20, 1970.

References

Sources

Defunct nightclubs in the Las Vegas Valley
1955 establishments in Nevada
1970 disestablishments in Nevada
Defunct casinos in the Las Vegas Valley
West Las Vegas